The 2002–03 Czech 1.liga season was the tenth season of the Czech 1.liga, the second level of ice hockey in the Czech Republic. 14 teams participated in the league, and HC Kladno won the championship.

Regular season

Playoffs

Quarterfinals
 HC Rabat Kladno – SK Horácká Slavia Třebíč 3:0 (5:1, 5:1, 3:2 P)
 HC Dukla Jihlava – IHC Písek 3:2 (4:1, 2:3 SN, 4:6, 5:2, 1:0)
 KLH Chomutov – HC Slovan Ústí nad Labem 3:2 (5:8, 4:0, 2:1 P, 2:6, 6:2)
 BK Mladá Boleslav – HC Prostějov 2:3 (6:3, 3:2 SN, 1:5, 0:1, 2:7)

Semifinals 
 HC Rabat Kladno – HC Prostějov 3:0 (2:0, 5:4 P, 5:1)
 HC Dukla Jihlava – KLH Chomutov 3:0 (5:2, 4:1, 3:2)

Final 
 HC Rabat Kladno – HC Dukla Jihlava 3:1 (4:2, 4:3 SN, 1:4, 5:1)

Qualification

Relegation

External links
 Season on hockeyarchives.info

2002–03 in Czech ice hockey
Czech
Czech 1. Liga seasons